Marun Field is an oil field in the Khuzestan province of Iran and is the second-largest oil field in Iran. The field was discovered in 1963, and owned by state-owned National Iranian Oil Company (NIOC) and operated by National Iranian South Oil Company (NISOC).

The Marun field contains estimated recoverable oil reserves of 22 billion barrels making it the world's sixth biggest onshore oil field in the world. It is the second biggest producing oil field in Iran, after Ahvaz Field.

The super-giant Marun field, has long been one of the most prolific oil fields in Iran. It reached a peak of 1.34 million b/d in 1976, and although it has since declined, it remains in the top three producing fields alongside Ahvaz Field and Gachsaran Field. The smaller Kupal oil field and Shadegan oil field, located north and south of Marun. The Marun field was brought on stream in 1966 and its production gradually raised to more than one million barrels of oil a day in 1972. It consists of two oil reservoirs and one gas reservoir named Asmari, Bangestan, and Khami, respectively.

See also

List of oil fields

References

Oil fields of Iran